Barrington Parker may refer to:

 Barrington D. Parker (1915–1993), judge of the United States District Court for the District of Columbia
 Barrington Daniels Parker Jr. (born 1944), senior judge of the United States Court of Appeals for the Second Circuit